The 2022 Belarusian Super Cup was held on 25 February 2023 between the 2022 Belarusian Premier League champions Shakhtyor Soligorsk and the 2021–22 Belarusian Cup winners Gomel. Shakhtyor Soligorsk won the match 1–0 and won the trophy for the second time.

Match details

See also
2022 Belarusian Premier League
2021–22 Belarusian Cup

References

Belarusian Super Cup
Super
Belarusian Super Cup
Sports competitions in Minsk
2020s in Minsk
FC Shakhtyor Soligorsk matches